The Inca Civil War, also known as the Inca Dynastic War, the Inca War of Succession, or, sometimes,  the War of the Two Brothers, was fought between half-brothers Huáscar and Atahualpa, sons of Huayna Capac, over succession to the throne of the Inca Empire. The war followed Huayna Capac's death.

It began in 1529, and lasted until 1532. Huáscar initiated the war; appointed as king and claiming the throne because he was pure Inca, he wanted to defeat Atahualpa's competition. Atahualpa was tactically superior to his brother in warcraft and to the mighty armies of Cuzco, which their father had stationed in the north part of the empire during the military campaign. Accounts from sources all vary in the exact details. Following Atahualpa's victory, Spanish forces led by Francisco Pizarro invaded this region. He ultimately captured and killed Atahualpa, after receiving a ransom that was purportedly to free him.

Causes of the division of the empire 

In 1524-1526, the Spaniards under the command of Francisco Pizarro, explored South America.  There were 62 horsemen and 106 foot soldiers. They are believed to have carried smallpox to the continent, as it had been endemic among Europeans for centuries. The new infectious disease erupted in epidemics and caused high mortality and disaster for the Inca and other indigenous peoples, who had no immunity.

Sapa Inca Huayna Capac (also spelled Wayna Qhapaq) travelled north to investigate the strangers. Although he did not personally encounter any Spaniards, he contracted smallpox and died in 1527. His eldest son and heir, Ninan Cuyochi, died soon after him. It was uncertain who should be the next Inca king; they had no clear rules of succession.   Two sons of Huayna Capac, Huáscar and Atahualpa, born of different mothers, both claimed the position.

Huayna Capac had appointed Huáscar as king, and he was supported by the nobility in Cuzco, by religious and political authorities and other main figures. He was considered the eldest "pure" Inca, because his parents, Huayna Capac and Chincha Ocllo, were siblings. As in some other cultures, the Inca violated incest rules to keep religious and political authority limited among a small elite. Huascar was described as ill-tempered, suspicious, and disrespectful of laws and customs.

Atahualpa's mother, Paccha, was born outside the royal family. She was part of the Shyri (also spelled Schyri) or Cara royal family and was the daughter of Cacha Shyri Duchicela, the former leader against the Incan conquest in the north.  Atahualpa was much liked in the North, as he was good-tempered and carried himself with royal dignity. He allegedly had cunning and early wisdom.

Nobles considered Atahualpa to be illegitimate, and Huáscar felt it an insult that a man he considered a "bastard" was considered for Sapa Inca.

Huáscar eventually became king, but he believed that Atahualpa should not have any more land and that he should pay homage to him.

Movements during the war 
Soon after Huáscar claimed the throne, he expected all subjects to swear him allegiance.  To announce his loyalty, Atahualpa sent his most trusted captains to Cuzco, along with generous gifts of gold and silver (as was customary). Suspicious, Huáscar refused Atahualpa's offering. Accusing the half-brother of rebellion, he ordered some of his messengers killed, and sent back his captains dressed as women. Atahualpa declared war against his brother.

Just before the Spaniards arrived in Cajamarca, Atahualpa had sent troops to Cusco to capture Huáscar, and headed south himself to execute him. (Later Francisco Pizarro used this as one of the excuses to execute Atahualpa after Pizarro collected the ransom of gold and silver promised to him for his freedom.)

Huáscar gathered his soldiers in preparation for attack. After getting stunned by his brother, Huáscar proclaimed him a traitor.  Generals Chalcuchimac, Quizquiz, and Rumiñawi, are believed to have been born in the northern part of the empire, and transferred their loyalty to Atahualpa. He assembled the former imperial army in Quito, the Northern region left for his control. People loyal to Atahualpa created a new capital in Quito, so they could follow their preferred ruler and gain favor within the government.  Atahualpa agreed to take the leadership role of Sapa Inca in this new capital.

According to chronicler Diego de Rosales, at the moment of the civil war an Inca army was suppressing a rebellion in the Diaguita lands of Copiapó and Coquimbo. With the rebellion brutally repressed and the Inca giving rebels "great chastise", the commander of the army departed north to support Huáscar, a cousin.

At this news, Huáscar and his army moved north in a surprise attack at Tumebamba. The local Cañari supported the attack, in order to expel the nearest source of power, with the aim to oust the Inca. Atahualpa was captured and imprisoned. While the army celebrated, they got drunk and allowed a woman in to meet Atahualpa. She secretly took a tool that he used that evening to drill a hole and escape.  He immediately prepared a counterattack with his large, experienced army from Quito.

From 1531 through 1532, the armies fought many battles. Soon after his escape, Atahualpa moved his army south to the city of Ambato. There, on the plains of Mochacaxa, they found Huáscar's men, defeated them, and captured and killed many soldiers. Captives included the head general, Atoc, whom they tortured with darts and arrows. Atahualpa had his skull made into a "gilded drinking cup, which the Spaniards would note that Atahualpa was still using four years later.”

Following this victory, Atahualpa strengthened his army and continued south into his brother's land, winning every encounter. Entering Cajamarca, he added to his numbers. He first tried peaceful means to gain loyalty from Huáscar's men; when that did not work, he killed large numbers of opponents. The survivors were frightened into surrender. One report described how Atahualpa massacred the Cañari tribesmen because they pledged allegiance to Huáscar. When he finally arrived in Cajamarca, Atahualpa sent the majority of his army ahead, led by his head generals, while he stayed in the safety of the city and explored rumors that the Spaniards were entering the land.

Atahualpa's army pushed south through Huáscar's territory, winning at Bonbon and Jauja. The battle starting on the hillside of Vilcas seemed to favor Huáscar stationed in a stone fortress at the top of the hill, but eventually he retreated. Atahualpa's men won at Pincos, Andaguayias, at the battle between Curaguaci and Auancay northwest of Cuzco, at Limatambo, about 20 miles from Cuzco, and Ichubamba, where Huáscar's men fled. In 1532, with Cuzco endangered, “Huáscar sent another army to meet Atahualpa’s, but after precarious battles, his forces were routed," and Huáscar was captured. Atahualpa's army had won the war. The news traveled back to Atahualpa in Cajamarca, where the army learned about the Spanish incursion.

Pizarro and the end of the Spanish conquest of Peru 

Atahualpa was saluted as a hero; he recaptured Cajamarca, making camp outside the city with some 40,000 troops while Chalcuchimac and Quizquiz chased Huáscar's army to the south. With a disastrous northern campaign, Huáscar had not only lost his best generals and many soldiers, but his army was shocked and demoralized. Huascar and Atahualpa's armies met. Although Huáscar had a dominant position, he did not use it, instead retreating across the Cotabambas River on the way to Cuzco.

Chalkuchimac had a plan of his own and predicted the action of Topa Atao. He divided his army in two, sending one contingent around Topa Atao's back, and enveloping and destroying the defenders. In January 1532, only miles from Cuzco, Huáscar's retreat was cut off at Quipaipan, and his army was annihilated and disbanded. Huáscar was captured and the capital Cuzco was seized by Quizquiz. He purged it of Huáscar's supporters in a massacre. Huáscar was executed the following year.

During the course of the war, Atahualpa's army had grown to 250,000 men, all the strength of the Empire. However, before he could leave Cajamarca, the new king encountered the conquistador Francisco Pizarro, who had reached the city on 16 November 1532. Atahualpa was captured in the ensuing Battle of Cajamarca.<ref>Kubler, "The Behavior of Atahualpa," p. 418.</</ref>

While holding Atahualpa in custody, Pizarro told him he would have Huáscar brought to Cajamarca and would determine which brother was the better Sapa Inca. In response, Atahualpa ordered Huáscar killed, allegedly by drowning.  Months later on August 29, 1533, Pizarro's men hanged Atahualpa at the plaza of Cajamarca.

Casualties 
It is unknown how many Inca were killed or died during the civil war. The estimated population of the Inca empire before an epidemic (probably of a European disease) and the Spanish conquest is estimated at between 6 and 14 million people. The civil war, an epidemic, and the Spanish conquest resulted in a population decline over several decades estimated as 20:1 or 25:1, meaning that the population declined by 95 percent.

Notes

Bibliography 
Bauer, Ralph. An Inca Account of the Conquest of Peru. Boulder: University Press of Colorado, 2005.
Cieza de Leon, Pedro. The Discovery and Conquest of Peru (London: Duke University Press); 1998.
Cobo, Bernabe. History of the Inca Empire. Trans. Roland Hamilton. Austin, TX: University of Texas Press, 1979, 164-166.
D'Altroy, Terence. The Incas Malden, MA: Blackwell, 2002.
Davies, Nigel. The Incas Niwot, CO: University Press of Colorado, 1995.
de la Vega, Garcilaso. Royal Commentaries of the Incas. Austin: University of Texas Press, 1966.
Hemming, John. The Conquest of the Inca. New York, NY: Harcourt, Inc., 1970, 28-29.
Hyams, Edward, George Ordish.The Last of the Incas: The Rise and Fall of an American Empire. New York: Simon and Schuster, 1963.
 
 
MacQuarrie, Kim. The Last Days of the Inca. New York, NY: Simon & Schuster, 2007, 50.
Means, Philip A. Fall of the Inca Empire. New York: Charles Scribner's Sons. 1932.
 
Prescott, William H. History of the Conquest of Peru. Ed. John F. Kirk. Vol. 1. Philadelphia, PA: J. B. Lippincott & Co., 1874, 336.
 
Von Hagen, Wolfgang, The Incas of Pedro de Cieza de León. Trans. Harriey de Onis. Norman, Oklahoma: University of Oklahoma Press, 1959, 52, 80, 81, 251.

Inca Empire
History of South America
Civil wars involving the states and peoples of South America
Civil wars of the Middle Ages
Battles involving the Inca Empire
Pre-Columbian warfare
Conflicts in 1529
1530s conflicts
1529 in the Inca civilization
1532 in the Inca civilization
1530 in the Inca civilization
1531 in the Inca civilization
Wars of succession involving the states and peoples of South America